Eugenia Anatolyevna Isopaitis  (Russian:Евгения Анатольевна Изопайтис ) is a former Soviet tennis player. 

Isopaitis was a girls' singles finalist at the 1968 French Open lost to Australian Lesley Hunt in the final.

She played in singles at the Wimbledon in 1970 she lost to the British Veronica Burton in the first round. She partner in women's doubles, compatriot Olga Morozova lost in the third round to American Rosie Casals and Billie Jean King. Her partner in mixed doubles Vladimir Korotkov lost in the Third Round to Australian Ray Keldie and Kerry Harris.

Career finals

Singles (1–3)

Doubles (4–8)

References

External links 
 

1950 births
Soviet female tennis players
Living people